Alexander Harris may refer to:

 Alexander Harris (writer) (1805–1874), early Australian and Canadian writer
 Alexander L. Harris (1820–1898), U.S. politician
 Alexander Harris (New Zealand politician) (1878–1952), New Zealand politician
 Xander Harris, fictional character in the television series Buffy the Vampire Slayer

See also
 Alex Harris (disambiguation)
 Al Harris (disambiguation)